Trần Hiếu Ngân (born June 26, 1974 in Tuy Hòa, Phú Yên) is a Vietnamese Taekwondo athlete who competed in the Women's 49-57 kg weight class at the 2000 Summer Olympics, and she won the silver medal.
It was the only Vietnamese medal during the 2000 Summer Olympics, and their first of five Olympic medals.

Notes and references

External links
 
 
 

1974 births
Living people
People from Phú Yên province
Vietnamese female taekwondo practitioners
Taekwondo practitioners at the 2000 Summer Olympics
Olympic taekwondo practitioners of Vietnam
Olympic silver medalists for Vietnam
Olympic medalists in taekwondo
Medalists at the 2000 Summer Olympics
Asian Games medalists in taekwondo
Taekwondo practitioners at the 1998 Asian Games
Asian Games bronze medalists for Vietnam
Medalists at the 1998 Asian Games
Asian Taekwondo Championships medalists
21st-century Vietnamese women